The election of councillors to Allerdale Borough Council in Cumbria, England takes place every four years. At the 1999 boundary review, there were 56 councillors in 31 wards. This changed in 2019 following another boundary review. The number of councillors was reduced to 49 and the number of wards reduced to 23.

Political control
Since the first election to the council in 1973 political control of the council has been held by the following parties:

Leadership
The leaders of the council since 2003 have been:

† As deputy leader, assumed leadership duties from 21 February 2020, but not formally confirmed as leader himself until 3 March 2021.

Council elections
1973 Allerdale District Council election
1976 Allerdale District Council election
1979 Allerdale District Council election (New ward boundaries)
1983 Allerdale District Council election
1987 Allerdale District Council election (District boundary changes took place but the number of seats remained the same)
1991 Allerdale District Council election
1995 Allerdale Borough Council election
1999 Allerdale Borough Council election (New ward boundaries increased the number of seat by 1)
2003 Allerdale Borough Council election
2007 Allerdale Borough Council election
2011 Allerdale Borough Council election
2015 Allerdale Borough Council election
2019 Allerdale Borough Council election

Election results

Borough result maps

By-election results

1995-1999

1999-2003

2003-2007

2007-2011

2011-2015

2015-2019

2019-2023

References

 By-election results

External links
Allerdale Borough Council

 
Politics of Allerdale
Council elections in Cumbria
District council elections in England